Ellis Wilkinson Mineral Water Manufacturer, founded in 1852, at South Meadow Street, Preston, Lancashire, United Kingdom.

The mineral water trade was once a thriving industry in Preston, the largest manufacturer of which was Ellis Wilkinson, who first began making mineral waters at the same time that Matthew Brown was making his home-brewed ale at his small Pole Street, Preston, Brewery. Ellis and Matthew were friends who began making drinks together.

In addition to supplying local shops, Wilkinson's also agreed to supply Matthew Brown's growing number of pubs with minerals and also facilitated the production of drinks for Vimto in their early days of trading.

Ellis Wilkinson's first wife died in childbirth. His second wife was a strict Quaker from the USA and she played a prominent part in running the mineral water business.

Banking services in those days were limited and one of her tasks was to collect the roundsmen's cash. She stored the gold sovereigns in a bucket beneath the bed of their home, Ribbleton House, which stood in its own grounds near Gamull Lane.

Mixing the mineral water fruit essences in the early days was a skilled job but later they installed a carbonating and bottling plant. In 1928 the firm became a limited company with Wilkinson's four sons as the directors. Wilkinson's had an extensive range of drinks on their portfolio which were popular throughout the North West.

In addition to manufacturing pop, Wilkinson's were also chocolate and sweet wholesalers, which were made on site. Wilkinsons's also supplied tea and wine. At the peak of their trade they employed about 40 people.

In 1967 Ellis Wilkinson's merged with T. and R. Smith's soft drinks of Chorley who had already been taken over by Garfield Weston.

Other former local mineral firms who were already part of this group were Clayton's of Chorley, Medico of Blackburn, St Annes Mineral Waters and Turner's of Chorley.

In 1969 change was still in the air and T. and R. Smith's was taken over by J. N. Nichols (Vimto) of Manchester.

Director and general manager of the Chorley concern since 1967 was Ronald Wilkinson who was the Grandson of Ellis Wilkinson the founder of the former Preston mineral water business.

Companies established in 1852
1852 establishments in England